Jordankal ( or ) is a settlement west of Mirna Peč in Lower Carniola in southeastern Slovenia. The entire Municipality of Mirna Peč is included in the Southeast Slovenia Statistical Region.

References

External links
Jordankal on Geopedia

Populated places in the Municipality of Mirna Peč